The Soweto Open was a professional tennis tournament played on outdoor hard courts. It was part of the Challenger Tour and the ITF Women's Circuit as a $50,000+H event. It was held at the Arthur Ashe Tennis Centre in the Soweto urban area of Johannesburg, South Africa, from 2009 to 2011. The event was not held in 2012 and came back to the ITF Circuit and the ATP Challenger Tour in 2013. In 2013 on the ITF Circuit, the even was downgraded from a $100,000+H to $50,000+H.

Past finals

Men's singles

Women's singles

Men's doubles

Women's doubles

External links
 

 
ATP Challenger Tour
ITF Women's World Tennis Tour
Hard court tennis tournaments
Tennis tournaments in South Africa
Sports competitions in Johannesburg
Recurring sporting events established in 2009
Recurring sporting events disestablished in 2013
Defunct sports competitions in South Africa